Shockadelica is the second studio album by guitarist and songwriter Jesse Johnson. It was released in 1986 on A&M Records and peaked at number 70 on the U.S. Billboard 200 albums chart.

Background
According to Johnson, "Shockadelica" was a term he had used for years to describe an excited feeling he got from a song or woman. Prince, upon learning that the album did not have a title track, recorded a song for himself called "Shockadelica" and released it prior to Johnson's album, leaving the impression that Johnson had stolen the name.

The album is notable for featuring funk musician Sly Stone on the single, "Crazay". The album features songs that primarily consist of mainstream funk; an exception is the album's closing track, "Black in America", which received attention because of its title. Johnson remarked that it was misleading. "The song is really about a universal situation where no matter what you do or who you are, people see you as a black or Jew."

Track listing

Charts

References

1986 albums
Jesse Johnson (musician) albums